Acacia phasmoides, the phantom wattle, is a shrub species that is endemic to south-eastern Australia.

Description
It grows to between 1 and 4 metres high and has phyllodes that are 5 to 12.5 cm long and 1 to 2 mm wide. The bright yellow globular flowerheads appear singly or in groups of two in the axils of the phyllodes from September to November, followed by curved seed pods which are 5 to 9 cm long and 2 to 4 mm wide.

Taxonomy
The species was formally described in 1967 by botanist Jim Willis  based on plant material collected from Pine Mountain in north-eastern Victoria. It was reclassified as Racosperma phasmoides by Leslie Pedley in 2003 and then transferred back to genus Acacia in 2006.

Distribution
Its distribution is limited to a small area on the border between south-eastern New South Wales and north-eastern Victoria.
In New South Wales it is found along the southern edge of Woomargama National Park and has an estimated population of  2000 plants. In Victoria it is found in the Burrowa-Pine Mountain National Park from two stands east of the summit of Pine Mountain with nine plants in one stand and between 150 and 250 in the other.

See also
List of Acacia species

References

phasmoides
Flora of New South Wales
Flora of Victoria (Australia)
Fabales of Australia